Salvage is a lost 1921 American silent drama film directed by Henry King and starring Pauline Frederick. It was produced and distributed by the Robertson-Cole Company.

Cast
Pauline Frederick as Bernice Ridgeway / Kate Martin
Ralph Lewis as Cyrus Ridgeway
Milton Sills as Fred Martin
Helen Stone as Ruth Martin
Rose Cade as Tessie
Raymond Hatton as The Cripple
Hobart Kelly as Baby

References

External links

1921 films
American silent feature films
Lost American films
Films directed by Henry King
1921 drama films
Silent American drama films
American black-and-white films
Film Booking Offices of America films
1921 lost films
Lost drama films
1920s American films